Rilland-Bath is a railway station located 2 km north west of Rilland, The Netherlands. The station was opened on 1 March 1872 and is located on the Roosendaal–Vlissingen railway. The train services are operated by Nederlandse Spoorwegen

The station is named after the former municipality of Rilland-Bath.

Train service
The following services currently call at Rilland-Bath:
2x per hour intercity service Amsterdam - Haarlem - Leiden - The Hague - Rotterdam - Dordrecht - Roosendaal - Vlissingen

External links
NS website 
Dutch Public Transport journey planner 

Railway stations in Reimerswaal
Railway stations opened in 1872
Railway stations on the Staatslijn F